Yvonne Pokorny, later surname: Pal, is an Austrian former competitive figure skater. She is the 1992 Karl Schäfer Memorial bronze medalist and a five-time Austrian national champion. She placed 12th at the 1989 European Championships and 13th at the 1989 World Championships. In 2006, she was listed as an International Technical Specialist for Austria.

Competitive highlights

References 

Austrian female single skaters
Living people
Year of birth missing (living people)